Let's Do Lunch with Gino & Mel is a British daytime television programme which aired live on ITV from 2011 until 2014 as part of ITV Food, presented by Gino D'Acampo and Melanie Sykes. D'Acampo cooks various food items, whilst Sykes does the main presenting of the show. The show mixed food with celebrity chat. In each episode, a celebrity guest appeared to assist the hosts and chat to them about their latest projects.

Alongside the main show aired a pre-recorded Christmas series known as Let's Do Christmas with Gino & Mel (2012–2014), which saw D'Acampo cooking Christmas food, still with celebrity guests and chat. There were three series of the Christmas show.

Format

Gino's Masterclass
In some episodes, Gino shared his expertise with the viewers with his top tips on various topics. These included knife skills, tomatoes, bacon, pastry, pasta, rice, chicken, Yorkshire puddings, mashed potatoes, roast potatoes, sausages and meat.

Challenge Gino
In every episode, Gino had to take part in a food-related challenge. Some of them were attempts to get Gino a Guinness World Record. For the Christmas series, these tasks included Irish Coffee making, eating Brussels sprouts and making Chocolate truffles.

Sometimes there was no challenge, and etiquette expert William Hanson joined the show to talk about subjects such as Royal dining, wedding etiquette or restaurant manners.

In the first and second series, Gino's challenger received a tea towel with the printed text on it which says "I challenged Gino and all I got was this rubbish tea towel". In the third and fourth series, the challenger received a "Let's Do Lunch" lunchbox.

Transmissions

Episodes aired daily at 12:30pm for an hour when Loose Women took their summer break

Episode guide

Series 1

AGino broke the Guinness World Record

Series 2

AGino broke the Guinness World Record
BGino did not attempt this challenge

Series 3

AGino broke the Guinness World Record

Series 4

AThese episodes were pre-recorded and therefore there were no audience options, so Gino cooked set dishes instead.

Let's Do Christmas with Gino & Mel

Let's Do Christmas with Gino & Mel was a Christmas spin-off of Let's Do Lunch, which aired on ITV from 2012 until 2014. The series showed viewers how to cook easy meals during the Christmas period. Much like the regular series, Let's Do Christmas was hosted by D'Acampo and Sykes, along with a celebrity guest appearing in each episode. This, unlike the main series, was pre-recorded and not broadcast live.

There were several changes made to the studio set and format such as Christmas decorations that appear on the usual set. The series are pre-recorded at The London Studios in the summer of each year. As episodes were not broadcast live, the viewers recipe vote was dropped. In its place, Gino made another dish.

Let's Do Christmas has not returned to television since its third series in 2014. There was no fourth series in 2015, A re-run aired in place.

Transmissions

Episode guide

Series 1

AGino attempted to break the Guinness World Record but failed
BGino broke the Guinness World Record

Series 2

AGino attempted to break the Guinness World Record but failed
BGino broke the Guinness World Record

Series 3

References

External links

2011 British television series debuts
2014 British television series endings
2010s British cooking television series
2010s British television talk shows
British cooking television shows
ITV (TV network) original programming
Television series by ITV Studios
English-language television shows